Samson G Balfour Smith (born Samson Gazagnes Balfour-Smith) is a French/British electronic musician, record producer and live performance artist.

Musical life
Also known under the name of 138 Samson on the Berlin record label Bpitch control, where he was signed by Ellen Allien in 2004. Smith lives and performs in Berlin, beside performing all over the globe.

Between 2011 and 2012, Smith built his own virtual instruments, to perform under the name SCREEN NOISE project.

References

Electronica musicians
French electronic musicians
Living people
BPitch Control artists
Year of birth missing (living people)